Acrocercops attenuatum is a moth of the family Gracillariidae, known from Saint Thomas Island, in the Virgin Islands. The hostplant for the species is Croton flavens.

References

attenuatum
Moths of the Caribbean
Moths described in 1897